Staphylea colchica, the Caucasian bladdernut, Colchis bladdernut, or ,  or , is an ornamental shrub in the Staphyleaceae family. It is native to western Georgia. Its binomial name is derived from the western Georgian kingdom of Colchis.

This small tree (6–10 feet) is a rapidly growing deciduous species.  It grows best in well-drained and partly shaded locations.  Although it produces fragrant flowers and fruit, it spreads often by suckers.

Its buds, preserved in brine and seasoned with raw onion and vegetable oil, are a common dish in Georgia.

References

External links

Staphyleaceae
Flora of Asia
Flora of Europe
Cuisine of Georgia (country)